Sakariya Abdi Hassan (born 21 March 2001) is a footballer who plays as a midfielder for AFC Sudbury. Born in the Netherlands, he represents the Somalia national team at international level.

Club career
Born in the Netherlands, Hassan moved to England at the age of 8. He played youth football for Leyton Orient, Queens Park Rangers, Tottenham Hotspur and Saffron Walden Town.

Hassan began his career with Chelmsford-based club Springfield in 2019, making six Essex Olympian League appearances for the club, scoring once. Later that year, Hassan signed for Hornchurch. In September 2021, Hassan joined Redbridge on loan for a month. The following month, Hassan signed for Barking. In December 2021, Hassan joined AFC Sudbury.

International career
On 23 March 2022, Hassan made his debut for Somalia in a 3–0 loss against Eswatini in the qualification for the 2023 Africa Cup of Nations.

Career statistics
Scores and results list Somalia's goal tally first, score column indicates score after each Hassan goal.

References

2001 births
Living people
Association football forwards
People with acquired Somali citizenship
Somalian footballers
Somalia international footballers
Dutch footballers
Dutch people of Somali descent
Somalian expatriate footballers
Dutch expatriate footballers
Expatriate footballers in England
Somalian expatriate sportspeople in England
Dutch expatriate sportspeople in England
Hornchurch F.C. players
Redbridge F.C. players
Barking F.C. players
A.F.C. Sudbury players
Isthmian League players
Essex Senior Football League players